Bosmina longirostris is a species of water flea found in the Great Lakes and Central Europe. It is found in the plankton near the shoreline of lakes and ponds.

Morphotypes
Bosmina longirostris has multiple morphotypes. The most common morphotypes in freshwater are cornuta, pellucida, similis, and typica. The morphotypes refer to the size and curve of the antennules of the organism, as well as the size of the mucrones.

References

External links

Cladocera
Freshwater crustaceans of North America
Freshwater crustaceans of Europe
Fauna of the Great Lakes region (North America)
Crustaceans described in 1776
Taxa named by Otto Friedrich Müller